The Duel Painter was an ancient Corinthian vase painter in the black-figure style; his real name is unknown. He was active during the transitional period between Orientalising vase painting and black-figure proper. The Duel Painter preferred to decorate his aryballoi with fighting scenes, which is the basis for his conventional name. He was also one of the first Corinthian painters to depict birds.

Bibliography 
 Thomas Mannack: Griechische Vasenmalerei. Eine Einführung. Theiss, Stuttgart 2002, p. 101 .

References 

Ancient Greek vase painters